"Ash Like Snow" is the 17th single from the Japanese rock band, the Brilliant Green. It peaked at #8 on the Oricon Singles Chart.

This song serves as the second opening theme for the Japanese anime, Mobile Suit Gundam 00. The first press contains a Gundam 00 sticker, which differs between limited edition and regular edition, along with Allelujah Haptism's character ID card. The song's music video also made several references to Gundam 00 such as the appearance of Lockon's Haro and Tomoko dressed as Wang Liu Mei.
The song was released coincidentally with the band's singer's birthday.

Currently it has sold 50,868 copies in Japan according to the year end Oricon Chart of 2008.

It was later covered by BiSH for the album Mobile Suit Gundam 40th Anniversary Album ~BEYOND~.

Track listing

References

2008 singles
2008 songs
Defstar Records singles
Songs written by Shunsaku Okuda
Songs written by Tomoko Kawase
The Brilliant Green songs